Tetsuo Asano (born 1949 in Kyoto Prefecture, Japan) is a Japanese computer scientist,  the president of the Japan Advanced Institute of Science and Technology. His main research interest is in computational geometry.

Education and career
Asano was a student at Osaka University, earning bachelor's, masters, and doctoral degrees there in 1972, 1974, and 1977. He was on the faculty of Osaka Electro-Communication University from 1977 until 1998, when he joined JAIST. From 2012 to 2014 he was dean of the School of Information Science at JAIST. He became president of JAIST in April 2014

Awards and honors
In 2001 he was elected as a fellow of the Association for Computing Machinery "for his contributions to discrete algorithms on computational geometry and their practical applications to computer vision and VLSI design." He is also a fellow of the Institute of Electronics, Information and Communication Engineers and of the Information Processing Society of Japan.

Selected publications
.

.

References

External links
Google scholar profile
ResearchMap profile

1949 births
Living people
Japanese computer scientists
Researchers in geometric algorithms
Osaka University alumni
Fellows of the Association for Computing Machinery